Emanationism is an idea in the cosmology or cosmogony of certain religious or philosophical systems. Emanation, from the Latin emanare meaning "to flow from" or "to pour forth or out of", is the mode by which all things are derived from the first reality, or principle. All things are derived from the first reality or perfect God by steps of degradation to lesser degrees of the first reality or God, and at every step the emanating beings are less pure, less perfect, less divine. Emanationism is a transcendent principle from which everything is derived, and is opposed to both creationism (wherein the universe is created by a sentient God who is separate from creation) and materialism (which posits no underlying subjective and/or ontological nature behind phenomena being immanent).

Origins
Emanationism is a cosmological theory which asserts that all things "flow" from an underlying principle or reality, usually called the Absolute or Godhead. Any teachings which involve emanation are usually in opposition to creation ex nihilo as emanation advocates that everything has always existed and has not been "created" from nothing.

Kleinham (2007) writes:

Underlying the worldview of traditional cosmology is the idea that the universe is an emanation of a unitary divine principle. Although this idea has been blended with the revealed creationist doctrines of the major monotheistic religions, orthodox theologians have generally regarded it with suspicion. They have relegated it to the shadowy spheres of mysticism, pantheism, and the occult, which have always been at odds with orthodoxy. The traditional view is summed in the doctrine of emanation formulated by Plotinus.

The primary classical exponent of emanationism was the neoplatonic philosopher Plotinus, who in his Enneads described all things phenomenal and otherwise as an emanation ( aporrhoe (Ennead ΙΙ.3.2) or ἀπόρροια aporrhoia (II.3.11)) from the One (ἕν, hen). In 5.1.6, emanationism is compared to a diffusion from the One, of which there are three primary hypostases, the One, the Intellect (νοῦς, nous), and the Soul (ψυχή, psyche). 

Another advocate of emanationism was Michael Servetus, who was burned at the stake for his nontrinitarian cosmology.

Occultism
Emanationism is a common teaching found in occult and esoteric writings. According to Owen (2005):

Theosophy draws on Neoplatonic emanationism, in particular the concept of separation from and return to the Absolute, and reworks the Eastern concepts of karma and reincarnation to provide an evolutionary theory of both humankind and the universe.

Theosophy contends that all organisms—including animals and human beings—and all matter "flow" from a pure spiritual formation in the Absolute to a material one over time to become materialised and that they will later return to the Absolute after the cosmic cycle of life.

As Morgan summarises: "The Secret Doctrine laid out an emanationist view of the development of the physical universe, a process of ebb and flow in which spirit gradually unfolded itself in matter, attaining consciousness, and returning to spirit in a higher and more realised form." According to the emanationist cosmology of Madame Blavatsky all monads emerge from divine unity at the beginning of a cosmic cycle and return to this source at its close.

Blavatsky in her book The Key to Theosophy (1889) wrote that: "We believe in a universal divine principle, the root of all, from which all proceeds, and within which all shall be at the end of the great cycle of being."

Occultist Samael Aun Weor taught emanationism from his studies with the Kabbalah and Gnosticism. He mapped out a complex esoteric cosmology with matter flowing from different planes of existence all existing in the absolute. As Dawson (2007) comments: 

As with esoteric thought in general, Weor holds that the universe originated in the ordering activity of the absolute upon chaotic primordial matter, giving rise to (emanating) the subsequent planes of the created order (Pleroma).

See also
 Aeon (Gnosticism)
 Anathem
 Emanation in the Eastern Orthodox Church
 Jerusalem The Emanation of the Giant Albion
 Panentheism

References

External links
 Neoplatonism and Emanationism Many articles on Emanationism
 Emanation and Ascent in Hermetic Kabbalah Colin Low 2004. Presentation and notes on emanation and the roots of Hermetic Kabbalah
 Emanationism
 Enneads

Esoteric cosmology
Neoplatonism
Spiritual evolution
Religious cosmologies
Kabbalah
Theories in ancient Greek philosophy